Dan Houdek (born 21 August 1989) is a Czech footballer. His position is goalkeeper. He played in the Czech 2. Liga.

External links
 Profile at iDNES.cz

1989 births
Living people
Czech footballers
Association football goalkeepers
FK Čáslav players